Shortfin barracuda may refer to:

Australian barracuda, a fish found mainly outside Australia and New Zealand
Shortfin Barracuda-class submarine, a submarine class proposed for Australia's Collins-class replacement